The McLafferty rearrangement is a reaction observed in mass spectrometry during the fragmentation or dissociation of organic molecules. It is sometimes found that a molecule containing a keto-group undergoes β-cleavage, with the gain of the γ-hydrogen atom, as first reported by Anthony Nicholson working in the Division of Chemical Physics at the CSIRO in Australia. This rearrangement may take place by a radical or ionic mechanism.

The reaction 
A description of the reaction was later published by the American chemist Fred McLafferty in 1959 leading to his name being associated with the process.

See also 
 The Type II Norrish reaction is the equivalent photochemical process
 α-cleavage

References

Further reading

External links
 Fred McLafferty Faculty Webpage at Cornell University

Tandem mass spectrometry
Rearrangement reactions
Name reactions